is a Japanese comedian and television presenter. He performs tsukkomi in the comedy duo Unjash with his partner Kazuya Kojima. Watabe currently serves as a co-MC with Chisato Moritaka in the Fuji TV program Love Music.

Biography
Watabe was born in Hachiōji, Tokyo. He has an older brother and sister. He graduated from Hachiōji Municipal Katakura Stand Elementary School, Hachiōji Tatsunaka Mountain Junior High School, Tokyo Metropolitan Hino High School and Kanagawa University Faculty of Economics.

In 1993, when he was in his second year in university Watabe was invited from his high school classmate Kazuya Kojima to say that he "will not laugh with you" or "have only you". They later formed the comedy duo Unjash. Watabe was told from his partner that he was the fifth member. (According to Arashi no Shukudai-kun, aired on Monday, 14 January 2008)

He graduated from the second year of Jinrikisha Comedy School JCA. Watabe entered a half a year late, and had hardly received classes.

In 2017, Watabe married Nozomi Sasaki. In June 2020, Shukan Bunshun published allegations that Watabe had been involved in extramarital affairs throughout their relationship, some of which involved secret meetings at accessible toilet restrooms in Roppongi Hills, and for which he would pay his partner 10,000 yen in cash. Watabe admitted to the relationships and apologized for his behavior, cancelling several of his public appearances.

Filmography

TV programmes

Current

Former

Radio

Current

Former

TV dramas

Internet

Dubbing

Stage

Advertisements

Bibliography

Books

Serials

Screenplay

References

External links
 
 Ken Watabe on J-Wave 

Japanese comedians
Comedians from Tokyo
People from Hachiōji, Tokyo
Japanese radio personalities
Japanese television presenters
1972 births
Living people
Kanagawa University alumni